Bluejay Creek is a river in the east part of Thunder Bay District in northwestern Ontario, Canada. It is in the Lake Superior drainage basin and is a tributary of the Pic River.

Course
It flows north from the north end of the lake, then turns southwest and reaches Bluejay Lake.

See also
List of rivers of Ontario

References

Rivers of Thunder Bay District